Midukki was a 2013-2013 Indian reality television series in a beauty pageant style which was aired on the Mazhavil Manorama channel.

The first season of the show was hosted by Mollywood actress Rima Kallingal. Sneha Unnikrishnan was declared as the winner of the show. Popular choreographer Sajna Najam did the choreography for the contestants' performances. It was replaced by Uggram Ujjwalam.

Mazhavil Manorama announced the new season of the show in early September 2017. It was launched in a different manner only with a mega grand finale .

Plot summary 
The show aimed to find the smartest women of Kerala. The show consisted of four permanent judges: Ambika Pillai, Dr. Piyush, Dr. Zaileshya and Shalini. It was hosted by the Mollywood actress Rima Kallingal. It consisted of 20 contestants across Kerala who were aged 18–25.

Sneha Unnikrishnan won the first prize in Midukki. Remya Menon and Reba Monica John won 1st runner-up and 2nd runner-up respectively.

Results

Midukki 2017
Midukki 2017 show is aimed to find out most beautiful, most smart, most intelligent model from 14 districts of Kerala. Most aspiring models are aiming to win title of Midukki 2017 as it will give them great exposure to film industry. Auditions were held in famous colleges across Kerala and the selected top 14 contestants participated in the Grand Finale.Television personality Pearle Maaney hosted the finale episode along with RJ Mathukkutty.
Actress Shobhana was the chief judge along with Suraj Venjaramoodu , Prayaga Martin and Deepti Sati.

Shruthi Paul was titled "Midukki".

Top 5
Mintu
Shruthi
Aadithya
Shamil
Namitha
Merlin
Anna

References 

Malayalam-language television shows
2012 Indian television series debuts
Mazhavil Manorama original programming